Kirk O'Bee (born April 9, 1977, in Ada, Michigan) is a former professional road racing cyclist from the United States. He won two national championships – in 1997 the USPRO pursuit championship, and in 2001 the USPRO criterium championship.

Doping 

In 2002, O'Bee was suspended for a year after testing at the 2001 US championship showed an elevated testosterone-to-epitestosterone ratio. O'Bee said the positive drug test "resulted from a special training regimen recommended by his coach, which involved dietary supplements and exercise."

O'Bee was fired by the Bissell team on July 31, 2009, for a doping violation. On October 7, 2010, the United States Anti-Doping Agency handed O'Bee a lifetime ban for EPO usage. All results he obtained after October 3, 2005, were vacated.

Major results 

 1997
 1st – track pursuit,( National Pursuit Champion)
 1999 Mapei - Quick Step
 1st – Hasselt-Spa-Hasselt
 1st – Lys Lez Lannoy
 1st – Dunquerke-Wacuhal (Espoir)
 1st – two stages, Tour de Mosselle
 1st – points jersey, Tour de Mosselle
 2000 – U.S. Postal Service Pro Cycling Team
 2001 – Navigators Insurance Cycling Team
 1st  United States National Criterium Championships
 2002 – Navigators Insurance Cycling Team
 1st – GP Pino Cerami
 1st – GP de la ville de Rennes
 1st, Sprint Competition – Sea Otter Classic
 2003 – Navigators Insurance Cycling Team
 2004 – Navigators Insurance Cycling Team
 2005 – Navigators Insurance Cycling Team
 1st Overall – Tour de Delta
 1st Stage 4 – Cascade Classic
 1st Stage 6 – Cascade Classic
 1st Stage 2 – Tour de Delta
 1st – Tour de White Rock Road Race
 1st Overall – Canada Cup Road Race Series
 KOM – Ronde van Drenthe
 KOM – Tour de White Rock
 2nd – Ronde van Drenthe
 5th – USPRO Championship
 2006 – Health Net Pro Cycling Team Presented by Maxxis
 1st overall – Tour de Taiwan
 1st, Stage 5 – Tour de Taiwan
 2007 – Health Net Pro Cycling Team Presented by Maxxis
 1st stage 2 – Nature Valley Grand Prix
 1st stage 4 – Nature Valley Grand Prix
 1st stage 5 – Cascade Classic
 1st – Tour de Gastown
 1st – Giro di Burnaby
  1st  United States National Criterium Championships

See also 

 List of doping cases in cycling

References 

1977 births
Living people
People from Ada, Michigan
American male cyclists
Sportspeople from Michigan
Doping cases in cycling